E! was an Australian and New Zealand pay television channel, owned by NBCUniversal International Networks. Much like its American counterpart it featured entertainment-related programming, reality television and Hollywood news. It was available, at the time of closure, through the Foxtel and FetchTV platforms in Australia. It was available on the Sky platform in New Zealand, from April 2002 until 15 January 2023.  It was also available on the Austar service prior to 2012. In 2014, it became available on Australian streaming service Foxtel Play.

NBCUIN signed a content agreement with Seven West Media in the Australian spring of 2022, which includes the launch of a new terrestrial channel, 7Bravo on 15 January 2023, that now includes E! content; with this, the previous content agreement with Foxtel has expired, and E! closed at 5:59a.m. local time on 1 February 2023, which is considered the last minute of the 31 January broadcast day.

History
E! was relaunched in 2012, shortly after the American version of E! did the same rebrand, which included a revised logo. Kim Kardashian visited Australia to promote the rebranding.

The channel issued a casting call for journalists to become the face of E! Australia, and report on local entertainment news. The contest was won by Ksenija Lukich.

Programming

Original local programming
Fashion Bloggers (season 2 only, season 1 aired on sister channel Style Network)
The Hype (starts October 17, 2015)

Acquired programming from American E!

Botched
Botched by Nature
Christina Milian Turned Up
Dash Dolls
E! True Hollywood Story
Famously Single
Fashion Police
Good Work
Hollywood Cycle
I Am Cait
Keeping Up with the Kardashians
Mariah's World
New Money
Rich Kids of Beverly Hills
Sex with Brody
Stewarts and Hamiltons
The Soup
The Grace Helbig Show
Total Bellas
Total Divas
WAGS
We Have Issues

Acquired programming from other distributors 
Burning Love

Former programming

Chasing The Saturdays
Chelsea Lately
E! Host Australia Search
Hello Ross
House of Carters
Joan & Melissa: Joan Knows Best?
Kimora: Life in the Fab Lane
Love You, Mean It with Whitney Cummings
Opening Act
Sunset Tan
The Soup Investigates
The Wanted Life
What Would Ryan Lochte Do?

References

Television networks in Australia
English-language television stations in Australia
E!
2004 establishments in Australia
Television channels and stations established in 2004
2023 disestablishments in Australia
Television channels and stations disestablished in 2023
2023 disestablishments in New Zealand
Television channels in New Zealand
Defunct television channels in New Zealand
Defunct television channels in Australia
English-language television stations in New Zealand
Television channels and stations established in 2002
2002 establishments in New Zealand